Scaptesyle sororigena is a moth in the subfamily Arctiinae. It was described by Jeremy Daniel Holloway in 2001. It is found on Borneo. The habitat consists of lowland dipterocarp forests.

The length of the forewings is 6–7 mm.

References

Moths described in 2001
Lithosiini